Graphis alboscripta, commonly known as white script lichen, is a species of epiphytic lichen that is endemic to the west coast of Scotland. Nationally rare, its distribution is confined to hazel woodlands.

See also
Flora of Scotland
Jamesiella scotica

References

Flora of Scotland
Lichen species
Lichens of Europe
Lichens described in 1992
alboscripta
Biota endemic to Scotland
Taxa named by Brian John Coppins
Taxa named by Peter Wilfred James